The MTs 30 (МЦ 30) is a family of Soviet high-quality custom hunting combination guns.

History 
The gun was designed by M. I. Skvortsov (М. И. Скворцов), A. P. Glinskiy (А. П. Глинский) and I. P. Korneychev (И. П. Корнейчев) in 1960s - 1970s.

The first information and the first photograph of the new experimental three-barrelled combination gun MTs 30 were published in October 1960. The MTs 30-13 was announced in August 1961.

After tests and trials, in 1979, the first MTs 30-09 shotgun was shown at VDNKh exhibition in Moscow. It was produced by TsKIB SOO in small numbers.

In January 1979, the price of one custom MTs 30-09 gun was up to 2,000 roubles.

Design 
MTs 30 is a hammerless combination gun, with one barrel under two other.
 MTs 30-01, MTs 30-02 and MTs 30-03 have rifled barrels with four grooves
 all 9mm rifled barrels have six grooves with 320 mm twist rate.

It is equipped with safety mechanism and ejector.

All guns have a walnut shoulder stock (with cheekpiece) and fore-end, some of them were decorated with engravings.

MTs 30 can be equipped with optical sight.
 The first test prototype was equipped with TO-6P (ТО-6П) optical sight, although next guns were equipped with PO-4×34 (ПО-4×34) or TO-6PM (ТО-6ПМ) sights.

Variants 
 MTs 30-01 (МЦ 30-01) - the first test prototype with two smoothbore 20/70mm barrels and one 5.6mm rifled barrel chambered for experimental cartridge. It was equipped with TO-6P optical sight
 MTs 30-02 (МЦ 30-02) - the second test prototype with two smoothbore 20/70mm barrels and one 6.5mm rifled barrel chambered for 6.5×38mmR round
 MTs 30-03 (МЦ 30-03) - test prototype with two smoothbore 20/70mm barrels and one 7.62mm rifled barrel chambered for 7.62×38mmR round
 MTs 30-09 (МЦ 30-09) - model with two smoothbore 12/70mm barrels and one 9×53mmR rifled barrel
 MTs 30-12 (МЦ 30-12) - model with two 9×53mmR rifled barrels and one smoothbore 12/70mm barrel
 MTs 30-13 (МЦ 30-13) - test prototype with two smoothbore 20/70mm barrels and one 7.62mm rifled barrel chambered for 7.62×38mmR round
 MTs 30-20 (МЦ 30-20) - test prototype with two smoothbore 20/70mm barrels and one 5.6mm rifled barrel chambered for .22LR round
 MTs 140 (МЦ 140) - next model with two 650mm smoothbore 12/70mm barrels and one 9×53mmR rifled barrel

Users 

 
  - MTs 30-12 is allowed as civilian hunting weapon
  - one MTs 30 is registered as civilian hunting weapon
  - was allowed as civilian hunting weapon. On December 13, 1996, president of the Russian Federation B. N. Yeltsin signed the federal law № 150, which entered into force on July 1, 1997. In accordance with this law, possession of civilian firearms chambered for handgun ammunition was prohibited. As a result, since July 1, 1997, all MTs-30 guns chambered for handgun ammunition were banned on the territory of the Russian Federation and they had to be handed over to governmental law enforcement agencies for destruction.

References

Sources 
 Охотничье трехствольное ружьё МЦ 30 // Охотничье, спортивное огнестрельное оружие. Каталог. М., 1958. стр.30-31
 Охотничье трехствольное ружьё МЦ 30-20 // Спортивно-охотничье оружие и патроны. Бухарест, "Внешторгиздат", 1965. стр.62
 МЦ-30 // История Тульского оружейного завода, 1712 - 1972. М., "Мысль", 1973. стр.479
 МЦ-30-09 // журнал «Охота и охотничье хозяйство», № 6, 1982. стр.31
 М. М. Блюм, И. Б. Шишкин. Охотничье ружьё. М., «Лесная промышленность», 1983. стр.93-94
 Kulobrokový troják MC-30-20 // «Střelecká revue», 3, 1975

Multiple-barrel firearms
Double-barreled shotguns of the Soviet Union
Combination guns
TsKIB SOO products
7.62×38mmR firearms
9×53mmR firearms